Rudy Kuntner (June 10, 1908 in Vienna, Austria – December 16, 1982 in Rego Park, New York) was a U.S.-Austrian soccer forward who was a member of the U.S. team at the 1928 Summer Olympics.  He is also known as a long time stage manager for the Metropolitan Opera and is a member of the National Soccer Hall of Fame

Youth
Kuntner immigrated to the U.S. with his family when he was seven.  His family settled in the New York City area where he began playing soccer.  However, he was an all around athlete and played baseball, football, basketball and tennis at Gorton High School in Yonkers, New York.

Professional soccer
Kuntner signed with the New York Giants of the American Soccer League during the 1927–1928 season.  He played five games, all in the second half of the season, scoring three goals.  In 1928, he moved to the New York Hungaria in the short lived Eastern Soccer League.  After the collapse of the ESL in 1929, Kuntner moved to First Vienna (also known as Wiener Sports Club and New York Vienna F.C.) of the German American Soccer League.  In 1930, he was back in the ASL with Bridgeport Hungaria, but the team moved to Newark after ten games, then folded. He then moved to the New York Giants of the American Soccer League (ASL).  The Giants folded in 1932 and Kuntner moved to New York Americans of the second ASL.  In 1937, the Americans fell in the National Challenge Cup final to St. Louis Shamrocks.  In 1939, he was playing with Brooklyn St. Mary's Celtic when it won the National Cup final over Chicago Manhattan Beer.  Kuntner was still going strong in the 1942–1943 season when he scored nine goals in seventeen games with Brookhattan.  In 1945, he was still active with Brookhattan when it won the triple, the league title, Lewis Cup (league cup) and National Challenge Cup.

National and Olympic teams
Kuntner earned two caps with the U.S. national team in 1928.  At the time, the Olympic soccer games counted as full internationals and his first cap with the national team came in the 1928 Summer Olympics.  That game, an 11–2 loss to Argentina saw Kuntner score in his debut with the national team.  Following the tournament, the team traveled to Poland where it tied the Polish national team 3–3.  Kuntner again scored, joining a handful of U.S. players who scored in their first two international games.  Despite his scoring success, Kuntner was never again called into the national team.

Metropolitan Opera
In addition to his success on the soccer field, Kuntner found great success as a stage hand at the Metropolitan Opera.  He began as an electrician, but over the years moved into areas of greater responsibility including lighting and stage management.  According to the Soccer Hall of Fame profile, he "received wide acclaim for his role in the staging of Tristan and Isolde in 1971."

In 1963, Kuntner was inducted into the National Soccer Hall of Fame.

References

External links
 Soccer Hall of Fame bio

1908 births
1982 deaths
United States men's international soccer players
Olympic soccer players of the United States
Footballers at the 1928 Summer Olympics
Austro-Hungarian emigrants to the United States
American Soccer League (1921–1933) players
Bridgeport Hungaria players
New York Giants (soccer) players
New York Giants (soccer, 1930–1932) players
American Soccer League (1933–1983) players
New York Americans (soccer) (1933–1956) players
Brooklyn St. Mary's Celtic players
New York Brookhattan players
German-American Soccer League players
National Soccer Hall of Fame members
Soccer players from New York (state)
American soccer players
Association football forwards